Mordecai is one of the main personalities in the Book of Esther in the Hebrew Bible.

Mordecai or Mordechai may also refer to:

People

Mononym
 Kevin Thorn, American professional wrestler who used the ring name "Mordecai"

Surname

Mordecai
 Jacob Mordecai (1762–1838), pioneer in education in Colonial America
 Mike Mordecai, major league baseball player
 Moses Cohen Mordecai (1804-1888), American businessman, politician, parnas and owner of the Mordecai Steamship Line
 Leslie R. Mordecai, international commissioner of the Scout Association of Jamaica
 Pamela Mordecai, Jamaican writer, teacher, scholar and poet
 Tanner Mordecai (born c. 2000), American football player

Mordechai
 Yitzhak Mordechai, former Israeli general and Minister of Defense
 Yoav Mordechai, Israeli Brigadier General

Given name

Mordecai
 Mordecai Brown (1876–1948), baseball player nicknamed "Three Finger" or "Miner"
 Moti Daniel (born 1963), Israeli basketball player
 Mordecai Davidson (1845–1940), professional baseball owner and manager in the late 1880s
 Mordecai Lawner, American actor
 Mordecai Lincoln, uncle of Abraham Lincoln
 Mordecai Manuel Noah, Jewish American playwright
 Mordecai Kaplan, founder of Reconstructionist Judaism
 Mordecai Meirowitz, Master Mind board game inventor
 Mordecai Myers (New York politician), American merchant, politician, and military officer
 Mordecai Richler, Canadian author
 Mordecai Roshwald, American science fiction writer
 Mordecai Waxman, Jewish American Rabbi, responsible for inter-faith dialogue with The Vatican

Mordicai
 Mordicai Gerstein, American children's author

Mordechai
 Mordechai Anielewicz, Polish commander of Jewish Combat Organization during the Warsaw Ghetto Uprising
 Mordechai Ben David, Jewish American musician
 Mordechai ben Hillel or The Mordechai, major Talmudist and posek
 Mordechai Gur (1930–1995), Chief of Staff of the Israel Defense Forces
 Moti Kirschenbaum (born 1939), Israeli journalist, announcer, and TV presenter
 Mordechai Shani, Director General of the Sheba Medical Center and 2009 Israel Prize recipient
 Mordechai Shapiro, American singer
 Mordechai Spiegler (born 1944), Israeli football player and manager
 Mordechai Vanunu, Israeli nuclear technician

Mordechaj
 Dawid Mordechaj Apfelbaum (died 1943), officer in the Polish Army and a commander of the Jewish Military Union
 Mordechaj Gebirtig (1877–1942), Polish Yiddish poet and songwriter
 Mordechaj Józef Leiner (1801-1854), rabbinic Hasidic thinker and founder of the Izhbitza-Radzyn dynasty of Hasidic Judaism
 Mordechaj Maisel (1528-1601), philanthropist and communal leader in Prague
 Chaim Rumkowski (1877–1944), head of the Jewish Council of Elders in the Łódź Ghetto
 Mordechaj Spektor (1858–1925), Yiddish novelist and editor from the Haskalah period
 Mordechaj Tenenbaum (1916–1943), member of the Jewish Combat Organization (Żydowska Organizacja Bojowa) and leader of the Białystok Ghetto Uprising

Fiction
 Mordecai, a main character in the animated television series Regular Show
 Mordecai, a character in Gearbox Software's Borderlands
 Mordechai Jefferson Carver, a character from the film The Hebrew Hammer
 Mordecai Green, fictional lawyer for the poor in John Grisham's The Street Lawyer
 Dr. Mordecai Sahmbi, character from the Science Fiction TV show Time Trax
 Mordecai, a character in the movie The Cabin in the Woods

Places
 Givat Mordechai, a Jewish neighborhood in southwest-central Jerusalem, Israel
 Kfar Mordechai, a village in central Israel
 Mordecai Place Historic District, a neighborhood in downtown Raleigh, North Carolina
 Neot Mordechai, a kibbutz in Israel
 Yad Mordechai, a kibbutz in Israel

Buildings 
 Mordecai House (Raleigh, North Carolina), listed on the NRHP in North Carolina
 Mordecai Lincoln House (Springfield, Kentucky), listed on the NRHP in Kentucky
 Mordecai Lincoln House (Lorane, Pennsylvania), listed on the NRHP in Pennsylvania

Other uses
 "Mordecai", a song by Between the Buried and Me from the 2003 album The Silent Circus
 Mordecai, a pet hawk in the film The Royal Tenenbaums
 Mordecai (band), a synth pop group from Portland, Oregon
 Mordechai (album), a 2020 studio album by Khruangbin

See also
 Mortdecai, a 1970s series of novels by Kyril Bonfiglioli
 Mortdecai (film), a 2015 film starring Johnny Depp

Buildings and structures disambiguation pages